Bullas is a municipality and town in the Region of Murcia, southeast Spain, located 53 km from the provincial capital, Murcia. it is the highest municipality in the Region of Murcia after Moratalla.

The surrounding area is noted for the production of wine.

Geography 
The River Mula traverses the municipality from west to east. Part of two streams occur in the northwestern quarter from south to north. There are also two streams and two ramblas (usually dry water beds with water course during rainy periods) in the southern half of the municipality.

Economy 
57.7% of the territory is used for land crops. The most widely grown product by far is almonds although apricots, olives and grapes are also widely grown. 13.94% agreements were written for jobs in the agriculture sector in 2019 and 18.24% workers were hired as agriculture labourers in the first half of 2016.  36.02% agreements were written for jobs in the industry sector and 41.43% workers were hired as fabrication labourers.

Facilities

Healthcare 
There is a consultorio (primary care centre with the fewest functions) and a centro de salud (primary care centre).

Education 
The main town hosts two early childhood and primary education centres (CEIP) and one secondary education centre (IES). Another early childhood and primary education centre can also be found in La Copa.

Twin towns
 Villajoyosa, from 1999
 Groesbeek, from 2012
 Bosa, from 2013

See also
Castle of Bullas

References 

Official website

External links 
   
  community information for Bullas town
 

Municipalities in the Region of Murcia